The Dayton Wings were a professional basketball franchise based in Dayton, Ohio, from 1991–1992. They entered the World Basketball League in 1991 as an expansion team (along with the Florida Jades, Halifax Windjammers and Nashville Stars). They finished the 1991 season as the WBL champions, defeating Calgary in the final. They were leading the Southern Division in 1992 when the league folded mid-season.

The Wings played home games at the Ervin J. Nutter Center in Fairborn, a suburb of Dayton.

References

World Basketball League teams
Sports teams in Dayton, Ohio
1991 establishments in Ohio
1992 disestablishments in Ohio
Basketball teams established in 1991
Sports clubs disestablished in 1992
Basketball teams in Ohio